Cobb Hill is an intentional community in Hartland, Vermont in the United States. Its design borrows from other community, agricultural, and environmental action models: cohousing, ecovillages, sustainable communities, community-supported agriculture (CSA), agricultural collectives, sustainability research and action organizations.

Green Construction
23 households live in tightly clustered houses on  that include a working, partly horse-powered, farm and forest. Another member lives in an 1800s farmhouse on the property. The new homes and common house were built using green building principles: buildings oriented to maximize solar hot water and passive solar heating, very good insulation and windows, composting toilets, two Garn brand wood gasifying furnaces to heat all units, certified and local building materials, and Energy Star appliances.

Agriculture at Cobb Hill
Agricultural enterprises include a vegetable CSA (Community-supported agriculture) and dairy called Cedar Mountain Farm, Cobb Hill Cheese, Cobb Hill Frozen Yogurt, Cobb Hill Maple Syrup, Cobb Hill Icelandic Sheep, Cobb Hill Mushrooms, beekeeping/honey, poultry, egg production, hay, and forestry. Each enterprise is structured as a partnership of an interested and invested subset of community members. While the enterprises all use mostly organic methods they have chosen not to seek organic certification. Sustainable agriculture and production for local and regional markets are emphasized. Some of the residents bring in a significant part of their household income from the agricultural enterprises.

Community

Cobb Hill members seek a sustainable lifestyle. Beyond green houses and producing food locally there is shared intention to explore other forms of local and global education and action. This plays out in many ways and at varied levels of commitment and time for different members. Members participate in the many activities that keep the community functioning socially and physically - shared meals twice a week, monthly work days and community meetings, standing and ad hoc committees, social events. Over time deep friendships have developed. Conflicts also happen. The community has shown resilience and tenacity in exploring how to move collectively from wide-ranging personal interest to common ground.

Donella Meadows Institute (formerly Sustainability Institute)
Some Cobb Hill members worked in the initial years at the Sustainability Institute, which was adjacent to the cohousing village and farm. Dana Meadows, a founding member of Cobb Hill also founded the Institute before her death in 2001. In 2011 the Sustainability Institute was renamed as the Donella Meadows Institute and moved its offices to nearby Norwich, Vermont.

References

External links
Cobb Hill
Cedar Mountain Farm CSA
Cobb Hill Cheese
Garn Wood Gasifying Furnaces

Ecovillages
Agriculture in Vermont